Thomas J. Moore (May 1, 1883 – February 12, 1955) was an Irish-American actor and director. He appeared in at least 186 motion pictures from 1908 to 1954. Frequently cast as the romantic lead, he starred in silent movies as well as in some of the first talkies.

Born in Fordstown Crossroads in May 1883 , County Meath, Moore, along with his brothers, Owen, Matt, and Joe, and their sister Mary (1890–1919), he emigrated to the United States as a steerage passenger on board the S.S. Anchoria and was inspected on Ellis Island in May 1896 . Owen and Matt also had successful movie careers. Tom Moore appeared in his first silent motion picture in 1908. He also directed 17 motion pictures in 1914 and 1915, including The Secret Room (1915).

Personal life

In 1914, he married silent star Alice Joyce, with whom he had a daughter, Alice Moore (1916–1960), who acted in six films with her father from 1934 to 1937. While in New York City on New Year's Eve 1920, Moore met the young French actress Renée Adorée. A whirlwind romance ensued and six weeks after their meeting, they were married, on February 12, 1921, in his home in Beverly Hills. The marriage lasted only a few years. In 1931, Moore was married a third time, to actress Eleanor Merry. His brother, Owen Moore, was also an actor, and was married to Mary Pickford.

The Great Depression saw many studios close and much consolidation as the motion picture industry went through tough times. Moore retired from the screen in the mid-1930s. Ten years later, he returned to act in minor supporting roles.

Tom Moore died of cancer at age 71 in Santa Monica, California. He has a star on the Hollywood Walk of Fame at 1640 Vine Street.

Selected filmography

The Christmas Burglars (1908, Short) - Customer
The Helping Hand (1908, Short) - Man in Office / Wedding Guest
The Criminal Hypnotist (1909, Short) - Party Guest
The Vampire's Trail (1914, Short) - Horace Payne - a Wealthy Broker
The Judge's Wife (1914) - Mr. Johnson
Dollars and the Woman (1916) - Dan Hilyer
The Primrose Ring (1917) - Bob MacLean
The Jaguar's Claws (1917) - Phil Jordan
The Lesson (1917) - Chet Vernon
Little Miss Optimist (1917) - Deal Hendrie
The Wild Girl (1917) - Donald MacDonald
The Cinderella Man (1917) - Anthony Quintard
Dodging a Million (1918) - Jack Forsythe
Go West, Young Man (1918) - Dick Latham
The Floor Below (1918) - Hunter Mason
The Danger Game (1918) - Jimmy Gilpin
The Fair Pretender (1918) - Don Meredith
Just for Tonight (1918) - Theodore Whitney Jr.
The Kingdom of Youth (1918) - Jimmy Betts
Thirty a Week (1918) - Dan Murray
Brown of Harvard (1918) - Tom Brown
A Man and His Money (1919) - Harry Lathrop
 One of the Finest (1919) - Larry Hayes
The City of Comrades (1919) - Frank Melbury
 Heartsease (1919) - Eric Temple
Lord and Lady Algy (1919) - Lord Algy
Toby's Bow (1919) - Tom Blake
The Gay Lord Quex (1919) - The Marquis of Quex
Duds (1920) - Phoebe Plunkett
 The Great Accident (1920) - Wint Chase
Stop Thief! (1920) - Jack Dougan
Officer 666 (1920) - Travers Gladwyn
Hold Your Horses (1921) - Daniel Canavan
Made in Heaven (1921) - William Lowry
Beating the Game (1921) - 'Fancy Charlie'
From the Ground Up (1921) - Terence Giluley
Mr. Barnes of New York (1922) - Mr. Barnes
Over the Border (1922) - Sgt. Flaherty
The Cowboy and the Lady (1922) - Teddy North
Pawned (1922) - John Bruce
The Harbour Lights (1923) - Lieutenant David Kingsley
Mary of the Movies (1923) - Himself (uncredited)
Marriage Morals (1923) - Young Harry Ryan
Rouged Lips (1923) - James Patterson III
Big Brother (1923) - Jimmy Donovan
Manhandled (1924) - Jim Hogan
One Night in Rome (1924) - Richard Oak
Dangerous Money (1924) - Tim Sullivan
Adventure (1925) - David Sheldon
On Thin Ice (1925) - Charles White
Pretty Ladies (1925) - Al Cassidy
Under the Rouge (1925) - Whitey
The Trouble with Wives (1925) - William Hyatt
A Kiss for Cinderella (1925) - Policeman
The Song and Dance Man (1926) - Happy Farrell
Good and Naughty (1926) - Gerald Gray
The Clinging Vine (1926) - Jimmie Bancroft
Syncopating Sue (1926) - Eddie Murphy
Cabaret (1927) - Tom Westcott
The Love Thrill (1927) - Jack Sturdevant
The Wise Wife (1927) - John Blaisdell
The Siren (1927) - Peter Dane
Anybody Here Seen Kelly? (1928) - Pat Kelly
His Last Haul (1928) - Joe Hammond
The Yellowback (1929) - O'Mara
Side Street (1929) - Jimmy O'Farrell
The Woman Racket (1930) - Tom
The Costello Case (1930) - Mahoney
The Last Parade (1931) - Mike O'Dowd
Stout Hearts and Willing Hands (1931, Short) - Lookalike Bartender 2
Cannonball Express (1932) - John Logan
Men Are Such Fools (1932) - Tom Hyland
 Neighbors' Wives (1933) - John McGrath
Bombay Mail (1934) - Civil Surgeon
The Dark Angel (1935) - Hunt Guest (uncredited)
Robin Hood of El Dorado (1936) - Sheriff Hannan (uncredited)
Trouble for Two (1936) - Major O'Rook
Parole! (1936) - Carmody (uncredited)
The Girl on the Front Page (1936) - Brace (uncredited)
Reunion (1936) - Dr. Richard Sheridan
Ten Laps to Go (1936) - Mr. Corbett - Norma's Father
Behind Green Lights (1946) - Metcalfe (uncredited)
The Shocking Miss Pilgrim (1947) - Office Clerk (uncredited)
Moss Rose (1947) - Coroner's Foreman (uncredited)
Mother Wore Tights (1947) - Man (uncredited)
Forever Amber (1947) - Killigrew (uncredited)
Scudda Hoo! Scudda Hay! (1948) - Judge Stillwell (uncredited)
The Walls of Jericho (1948) - Minor Role (uncredited)
Cry of the City (1948) - Doctor (uncredited)
Road House (1948) - Foreman (uncredited)
The Fighting O'Flynn (1949) - Tavernkeeper
The Redhead and the Cowboy (1951) - Gus
The Turning Point (1952) - Drugstore Owner (uncredited)
The Great Diamond Robbery (1954) - Seedy Man (uncredited)
Return from the Sea (1954) - Minor Role (uncredited)
The Human Jungle (1954) - Witness at Murder Scene (uncredited)

References

External links

Tom Moore at Virtual History

1883 births
1955 deaths
20th-century American male actors
20th-century Irish male actors
Irish people of New Zealand descent
Actors from County Meath
American male film actors
American male silent film actors
American male stage actors
American male television actors
Deaths from cancer in California
Irish male film actors
Irish male silent film actors
Irish emigrants to the United States (before 1923)